Kurpania is a census town in the Bermo CD block in the Bermo subdivision of the Bokaro district in the Indian state of Jharkhand.

Geography

Location

Area overview
Bokaro district consists of undulating uplands on the Chota Nagpur Plateau with the Damodar River cutting a valley right across. The East Bokaro Coalfield located in the Bermo-Phusro area and small intrusions of Jharia Coalfield make Bokaro a coal rich district. In 1965, one of the largest steel manufacturing units in the country, Bokaro Steel Plant, operated by Steel Authority of India Limited, was set-up at Bokaro Steel City. The Damodar Valley Corporation established its first thermal power station at Bokaro (Thermal). The soil is generally infertile and agriculture is mostly rain-fed.

Note: The map alongside presents some of the notable locations in the district. All places marked in the map are linked in the larger full screen map.

Demographics
According to the 2011 Census of India, Kurpania had a total population of 7,789, of which 3,993 (51%) were males and 3,796 (49%) were females. Population in the age range 0–6 years was 1,020. The total number of literate persons in Kurpania was 5,689 (84.04% of the population over 6 years).

As per 2011 Census of India, Phusro Urban Agglomeration had a total population of 186,139, of which males were 97,665 and females 88,874. Phusro Urban Agglomeration is composed of Phusro (NP), Bermo (CT), Jaridih Bazar (CT), Bokaro (CT) and Kurpania (CT).

 India census, Kurpania had a population of 7,440. Males constitute 54% of the population and females 46%. Kurpania has an average literacy rate of 67%, higher than the national average of 59.5%: male literacy is 75%, and female literacy is 59%. In Kurpania, 14% of the population is under 6 years of age.

Infrastructure
According to the District Census Handbook 2011, Bokaro, Kurpania  covered an area of 1.65 km2. Among the civic amenities, it had 10 km roads with open drains, the protected water supply involved tap water from treated sources, uncovered well, overhead tank. It had 1,313 domestic electric connections, 150 road lighting points. Among the medical facilities, it had 2 hospitals, 1 dispensary, 1 health centre, 4 family welfare centres, 10 maternity and child welfare centres, 10 maternity homes, 10 nursing homes, 5  medicine shops. Among the educational facilities it had 2 primary schools, 1 middle school, 1 secondary school, 1 senior secondary school, the nearest  general degree college at Jaridih Bazar 8 km away. Among the social, recreational and cultural facilities it had 1 cinema theatre, 8 auditorium/ community halls, 1 public library, 1 reading room. An important commodity it produced was coal. It had the branch office of 1 nationalised bank.

References

Cities and towns in Bokaro district